The Amsterdam Tournament  is a pre-season football tournament held for club teams from around the world, hosted at the Amsterdam ArenA. The 1999 tournament was contested by Ajax, Atlético Madrid, Lazio and Santos on 31 July and 1 August 1999. Lazio won the tournament.

Table

Matches

Day 1

Day 2

References
 

1999
1999–2000 in Dutch football
1999–2000 in Italian football
1999–2000 in Spanish football
1999 in Brazilian football